The 100th Boat Race took place on 3 April 1954. Held annually, the Boat Race is a side-by-side rowing race between crews from the Universities of Oxford and Cambridge along the River Thames.   In a race umpired by former Cambridge rower Kenneth Payne, Oxford won by  lengths in a time of 20 minutes 23 seconds, taking the overall record in the competition to 54–45 in Cambridge's favour.

Background
The Boat Race is a side-by-side rowing competition between the University of Oxford (sometimes referred to as the "Dark Blues") and the University of Cambridge (sometimes referred to as the "Light Blues").  First held in 1829, the race takes place on the  Championship Course on the River Thames in southwest London.  The rivalry is a major point of honour between the two universities; it is followed throughout the United Kingdom and, as of 2014, broadcast worldwide.  Cambridge went into the race as reigning champions, having won the 1953 race by eight lengths, and led overall with 54 victories to Oxford's 44 (excluding the "dead heat" of 1877).

Cambridge were coached by N. B. M. Clack (who had rowed in the 1952 race), James Crowden (who had represented Cambridge in the 1951 and 1952 races) and R. H. H. Symonds (who had rowed in the 1931 race).  Oxford's coaches were Hugh "Jumbo" Edwards (a Blue in 1926 and 1930), W. J. Llewellyn-Jones, J. H. Page and A. D. Rowe (who had represented Oxford in the 1948 and 1949 races). The race was umpired for the fourth time by the former British Olympian Kenneth Payne, who had rowed for Cambridge in the 1932 and 1934 races.

During the build-up to the race, the rowing correspondent for The Times had suggested that "until three weeks ago a Cambridge victory seemed almost certain" but practice rows had proved disappointing.  The Oxford crew had been struck down by influenza in training, and had to reshuffle their order a month before the race.  Although the new order "seemed weak", they made better progress in training than Cambridge, yet the Light Blues, who were described as "well drilled" but with "erratic timekeeping" nevertheless remained "precarious favourites".

Crews
The Oxford crew saw two members return to the boat, including the cox W. R. Marsh and their boat club president H. M. C. Quick, who was making his third consecutive appearance. Cambridge's crew contained a single participant with Boat Race experience in their stroke and boat club president J. A. N. Wallis. According to the rowing correspondent for The Times, "perhaps the crews have never been more closely matched". Oxford's crew contained four non-British participants, all of them Australian, in E. V. Vine, J. A. Gobbo, J. G. McLeod and Edward Pain.

Race

Oxford won the toss and elected to start from the Surrey station, handing the Middlesex side of the river to Cambridge.  In a stiff south-westerly wind, umpire Payne started the race at 12:45 p.m.  Oxford made a quick start, and according to the rowing correspondent of The Times "literally leaped away, seemingly to row two strokes almost before Cambridge had begun".  By the end of the first minute, the Dark Blues were a few feet ahead but with the bend in the river favouring Cambridge, the crews were level by Craven Steps.  Despite a push from Cambridge's stroke M. J. Marshall, the Light Blues could not gain any advantage and both crews passed the Mile Post level.

Although rating slightly lower than their opposition, Oxford made the best of the bend in the river at Harrods Furniture Depository to lead by about a canvas-length by the time they passed below Hammersmith Bridge.  A strong headwind faced both crews as they rowed into Chiswick Reach and Cambridge struggled in the rough water in the middle of the river.   Oxford, whose cox W. R. Marsh had steered towards the shelter of the Surrey shore, gained a length in half a minute, extending out to almost four lengths by Barnes Bridge.  Oxford won by  lengths in a time of 20 minutes 23 seconds, for their second victory in eight years.

References
Notes

Bibliography

External links
 Official website

1954 in English sport
1954 in rowing
The Boat Race
April 1954 sports events in the United Kingdom
1954 sports events in London